A palatal fricative is a type of fricative consonant that is also a palatal consonant. The two main types of palatal fricatives are:
 voiceless palatal fricative
 voiced palatal fricative
They are produced with the friction of the dorsum of the tongue against the hard palate.

Phonemic palatal fricatives are decently rare, especially the voiced palatal fricative. They occur more often as allophones, as in German's velar fricatives next to /i/ or /y/, or as alternative realizations of the voiced palatal approximant.

References 

Fricative consonants
Palatal consonants